Silvana Valente is an Italian paralympic cyclist who has represented Italy at the 2000 Summer Paralympics in the open tandem track events with her guide Fabrizio Di Somma. She also competed at the 1998 World Championships in Colorado Springs. She joined the Italian Paralympic committee in 2009 after other successes at mountain biking.

Biography
Valente was born blind and she is a physiotherapist. She was able to take up competitive track cycling due to an initiative in the city  of Vicenza. She competed at the world paralympic event in 1998 and travelled to Sydney in 2000 to attend the Paralympic Games. She and her tandem partner, Fabrizio Di Somma. took the silver medal in the pursuit as well to other bronze medals.

Valente won numerous Italian national competitions before taking up mountain biking where she was again successful. In 2009 she joined the Italian Paralympic committee. She has published two books of poetry.

References

External links
 

Cyclists at the 2000 Summer Paralympics
Paralympic cyclists of Italy
Living people
1963 births